SW1 may refer to:

SW1, a postcode district in the London SW postcode area
EMD SW1, a diesel-electric locomotive manufactured between 1938 and 1953
 Star Wars: Episode I – The Phantom Menace, a 1999 film
Star Wars MUSH, an online text-based role-playing game
Shawn Wayans, known as DJ SW1
Cheng Lim LRT station, Singapore